The 1931 All-Ireland Senior Football Championship Final was the 44th All-Ireland Final and the deciding match of the 1931 All-Ireland Senior Football Championship, an inter-county Gaelic football tournament for the top teams in Ireland.

Kildare led 0-7 to 0-4 at half-time but Kerry outclassed them in the second half, a defensive mixup allowing a Paul Russell long shot drop into the goals.

It was the second of five All-Ireland football titles won by Kerry in the 1930s.

References

External links
, a British Pathé newsreel of the game

All-Ireland Senior Football Championship Final
All-Ireland Senior Football Championship Final, 1931
All-Ireland Senior Football Championship Finals
Kerry county football team matches
Kildare county football team matches